Shrewley Tunnel is a canal tunnel near Shrewley, Warwickshire, England, which opened in 1799. It became part of the Grand Union Canal in 1929.

History
The Warwick and Birmingham Canal Company obtained an Act of Parliament in March 1793, which authorised the construction of a  canal from the Digbeth Branch Canal of the Birmingham Canal Navigations to Warwick, where it would end at Saltisford Wharf. The plans showed three tunnels, at Shrewley, Rowington and Yardley, but as construction progressed, the last two became deep cuttings. This was not an option at Shrewley, as the route passed under the village. The plans also specified that the tunnel would be suitable for boats but not barges, implying that it would have been suitable for  narrow boats, common on the Birmingham system, but not for wider craft.

It officially opened on 19 December 1799 when the rest of the Warwick and Birmingham Canal was completed, although no trading took place until the following March. It became part of the Grand Union Canal in 1929 following the amalgamation of the canal company with several others, including the Grand Junction. 

There are actually two tunnels: at the northern portal, the towpath splits off and rises on a ramp and then enters a tunnel of its own, until it reaches the road which crosses the tunnel; having crossed this the path then descends on another ramp to reach the southern portal. The interior of the tunnel is unusually wet and this has led to the creation of flowstone formations.

Location
The tunnel runs from the south-east to the north-west. Kingswood Junction, which connects to the Stratford-upon-Avon Canal occurs about halfway along this stretch.

Coordinates

See also
Legging (canals)
List of canal tunnels in Great Britain

Bibliography

References

External links

Canal tunnels in England
Tunnels completed in 1799
Tunnels in Warwickshire